Dong Sun (born 1967) is a Chinese scientist in Hong Kong who is currently the Chair Professor and Head of the Department of Biomedical Engineering and Director of the Centre for Robotics and Automation at the City University of Hong Kong. He is also the Secretary for Innovation, Technology and Industry of the HKSAR Government. Sun is a pioneer in microrobotics and biomedical engineering, making numerous breakthroughs in robotic  manipulation of cells for precision medicine.

Sun was named a Fellow of the Institute of Electrical and Electronics Engineers (IEEE) in 2015 for contributions to robot-aided manipulation of biological cells. He is a Fellow of the Canadian Academy of Engineering and a Member of the European Academy of Sciences and Arts.

Sun founded a high-tech company at the Hong Kong Science Park, involved in technology transfers and conducting extensive applied researches in advanced robotics and motion controls with impactful contributions to industry and society. Sun was a recipient of Hong Kong Awards for Industry in 2004 and 2012.

Public service
Dong Sun is an elected member of the Committee for the Technology and Innovation Constituency. During the 2021 Hong Kong legislative election, Sun was elected to the 7th Legislative Council of Hong Kong for the Election Committee (constituency).

Sun has advocated for Hong Kong's development as an international science and technology centre, creating synergistic development with the Greater Bay Area. Sun has promoted the “Matrix Model of Science and Technology Innovation", calling for an integrated science and technology ecosystem supporting impactful scientific research, accelerated technology transfer, and the strengthening of competitive industries.

In January 2022, Sun was one of three people, out of 90 legislative council members, who took his oath using Mandarin rather than the local language, Cantonese.

In June 2022, Sun was appointed Secretary for Innovation, Technology and Industry of the HKSAR Government, assuming office on 1 July 2022.

On 8 October 2022, Sun defended the LeaveHomeSafe app, and said "We use the LeaveHomeSafe app system to support the government's anti-pandemic policies very successfully." In contrast, a government pandemic advisor, David Hui, said the app should stop being used.

On 23 October 2022, Sun warned that Hong Kong was lagging behind other cities and said the next few years will be Hong Kong's last chance to become a global innovation and tech hub.

In November 2022, Sun met with employees of Google and "mounted solemn negotiations" about the search engine's ranking of Glory to Hong Kong. Sun requested that Google "remove wrong information from the search results." In March 2023, Sun said "We have been in negotiation many times hoping it would remove the wrong information, but it is regrettable that it has not taken corresponding measures."

Education
Ph.D., Robotics and Automation, Chinese University of Hong Kong
M.S., Precision Instrument and Biomedical Engineering, Tsinghua University, Beijing, China
B.Sc., Precision Instrument and Mechanology, Tsinghua University, Beijing, China

Research fields
Cell-based bioengineering
Multirobot system
Mechatronics and Motion controls

Personal life 
As of August 2022, Sun owns at least five properties, with 4 registrable properties in Hong Kong (three residential properties and one parking space) and 1 in registrable residential property in mainland China.

On August 2022, Sun was tested positive for COVID-19.

References 

Fellow Members of the IEEE
Living people
Academic staff of the City University of Hong Kong
Hong Kong engineers
HK LegCo Members 2022–2025
Members of the Election Committee of Hong Kong, 2021–2026
1967 births